Frederick Hamilton Jackson (1848–1923), also known as Frank, was a painter, designer, and author. He was a frequent exhibitor at the Royal Academy and in other places.

Biography 

F. Hamilton Jackson was born in 1848 in Islington, London. He won a first-class medal at the Royal Academy Schools, and became a teacher at the Slade school of art. He helped to found the Society of Designers, and served as vice-president there; he was similarly a founder member of the London Sketch Club and served as its first honorary secretary. He was a member of the Art Workers' Guild, becoming a council member in 1907; he was also on the council of the Society of Miniature Painters. He became vice-president of the Royal Society of British Artists.

He lived in Bedford Park, Chiswick from about 1880 until about 1904, and then moved to Wandsworth.

He made a set of stained glass windows for St Alban's Church, Acton Green in 1888, comprising Adoration of the Magi, Reception into Heaven, Jesus and the Doctors, and Jesus and the Children.

He created the mosaic reredos for St Bartholomew's Church, Brighton.

He died at his home in Wandsworth on the 13 October 1923 and is buried in Putney Vale Cemetery.

Works

 1903 Intarsia and Marquestry, a Handbook for the Designer and Craftsman - Sands & Co., London
 1904 True stories of the condottieri - Sands & Co., London
 1904 Mural painting – Sands and Co., London
 1905 "Sicily" 
 1906 The shores of the Adriatic, the Italian side: an architectural and archæological pilgrimage - John Murray, London
 1907 Cantor Lectures on Romanesque Ornament Printed by W. Trounce, (Series of three lectures delivered at the Society for the Encouragement of Arts, Manufactures & Commerce.)
 1908 The Shores of the Adriatic, the Austrian side, the Ku Istria, and Dalmatia - John Murray, London
 1912 Rambles in the Pyrenees and the adjacent districts - John Murray, London

References

External links
 
 

19th-century English painters
English male painters
20th-century English painters
1848 births
1923 deaths
20th-century English male artists
19th-century English male artists